Margarita Belén is a town in Chaco Province, Argentina. It is the head town of the Primero de Mayo Department.

The town became infamous when on 13 December 1976, a joint operation of the Argentine Army and the Chaco Provincial Police resulted in the Massacre of Margarita Belén during the so-called National Reorganization Process. The operation resulted in the torture and execution of 22 political prisoners.

External links

Populated places in Chaco Province
Populated places established in 1890